Woozle Hill is a hill near the center of Galindez Island, in the Argentine Islands in the Wilhelm Archipelago. First charted by the British Graham Land Expedition (BGLE) under Rymill, 1934–37. Named by the United Kingdom Antarctic Place-Names Committee (UK-APC) in 1959 after an imaginary animal in A.A. Milne's Winnie-the-Pooh which leaves tracks in the snow, in reality made by the tracker who is unaware that he is walking in circles. The hill was extensively used for ice observations and, as it can be approached from any direction, encircling tracks were often seen from the summit.

References

Hills of Graham Land
Landforms of the Wilhelm Archipelago